Jennings is an unincorporated community and census-designated place (CDP) in Missaukee County in the U.S. state of Michigan. The population was 264 at the 2010 census.  The CDP is located mostly in Lake Township with a small portion extending north into Caldwell Township.

History
Jennings was a lumbering center founded by Austin and William Mitchell, who named it for William Jennings Bryan. A post office opened on March 8, 1883, with J. Frank Schryer as the first postmaster. The office was discontinued on July 31, 1956. Jennings was a terminus of the Missukee spur of the Grand Rapids and Indiana Railroad, with a junction on the main line named Round Lake.

The community of Jennings was listed as a newly-organized census-designated place for the 2010 census, meaning it now has officially defined boundaries and population statistics for the first time.

Geography

The census-designated place is defined as being within Caldwell and Lake townships.

Demographics

References

Unincorporated communities in Missaukee County, Michigan
Unincorporated communities in Michigan
Census-designated places in Missaukee County, Michigan
Census-designated places in Michigan
Populated places established in 1885
1885 establishments in Michigan